High Germany (Roud 904), is a traditional folk song, once known throughout England, Ireland and Scotland, with a history spanning hundreds of years. There are three songs known as High Germany. This page focuses on the best known one, the others being The Two Lovers or True Lovers (Roud 1445) and The Wars of Germany (Roud 5608).

The song deals with a young man (usually named Willy) and his lover (Polly) lamenting over the his conscription to fight in Germany, "High Germany" referring to the southern, mountainous part of the country. He attempts to convince her to join him in the war. "Polly" professes her love, but declares she is not fit for war. "Willy" attempts to persuade her to change her mind, stating that he will buy her a horse to ride, and that they will eventually wed. "Polly" still refuses and laments that her man has been drafted away from her. The historical setting of the ballad is most likely either the War of the Spanish Succession (1701-1714) or the Seven Years War (1756-1763).

The first verse is usually as follows:

Cecil Sharp collected a version in 1906, and successfully encouraged Gustav Holst to use the melody in A Somerset Rhapsody (1907). Ralph Vaughan Williams later used the melody in the third movement of his famous English Folk Song Suite (1923).

Field recordings 
Countless versions of the ballad have been found, including numerous recordings, several of which are available online. The following examples are some which use variations of the famous tune.

 1908: Archer Lane of Winchcombe, Gloucestershire, recorded on phonograph by Percy Grainger
 1956: Phoebe Smith of Melton, Woodbridge, Suffolk, recorded by Peter Kennedy
 1968: Ethel Findlater of Dounby, Orkney, recorded by Alan J. Bruford

Popular recordings 

 1965: Martin Carthy performed a version of the song on his first album, Martin Carthy
 1969: The Dubliners performed the song on their album, At Home with The Dubliners, with Luke Kelly on lead vocals
 1972: Pentangle sang their version on Solomon's Seal
 2011: Tersivel performed a metal version of the song on their album For One Pagan Brotherhood
 2011: The Dreadnoughts included the lyrics and melody of the song in their medley, "The Cruel Wars"
 2021: The Longest Johns recorded their version as, "The Cruel Wars"

References 

Folk songs
Traditional ballads